Friendship Baptist Church may refer to:

Friendship Baptist Church (Pasadena, California), a Baptist church in Pasadena, California
Friendship Baptist Church (Washington, D.C.), a Baptist church in Washington, D.C